Linda Lee Goode Phillips (born October 21, 1952 in Mullens, West Virginia) is an American politician and a Democratic member of the West Virginia House of Delegates representing District 25 since January 12, 2013. Phillips served consecutively from January 2009 until January 2013 in the District 22 seat.

Education
Phillips earned her BA and MA from Marshall University.

Elections
2012 Redistricted to District 25, Phillips was challenged the May 8, 2012 Democratic Primary, winning with 2,145 votes (84.2%), and was unopposed for the November 6, 2012 General election, winning with 4,880 votes.
2008 When District 22 Democratic Representative Richard Browning ran for West Virginia Senate and left the seat open, Phillips ran in the six-way May 13, 2008 Democratic Primary and placed first with 3,531 votes (28.1%); incumbent Representative Mike Burdiss placed fourth; Phillips and fellow nominee Daniel Hall were unopposed for the November 4, 2008 General election where Phillips placed first with 6,824 votes (53.7%).
2010 Phillips and Representative Hall were unopposed for the May 11, 2010 Democratic Primary where Phillips placed first with 2,377 votes (54.9%), and won the three-way two-position November 2, 2010 General election with 4,357 votes (40.0%) ahead of Representative Hall and Republican nominee Shawn Spears; Hall was elected to the West Virginia Senate in 2012.

References

External links
Official page at the West Virginia Legislature

Linda Goode Phillips at Ballotpedia
Linda Goode Phillips at OpenSecrets

1952 births
Living people
Marshall University alumni
Democratic Party members of the West Virginia House of Delegates
People from Mullens, West Virginia
Women state legislators in West Virginia
People from Pineville, West Virginia
21st-century American women